The 1922 International cricket season was from April 1922 to August 1922. There were no major international tours held during this season.

Season overview

June

Scotland in England

July

Ireland in Scotland

August

Foresters in Netherlands

Incogniti in Netherlands

References

1922 in cricket